Minuscule 386 (in the Gregory-Aland numbering), δ 401 (Soden), is a Greek minuscule manuscript of the New Testament, on parchment. Paleographically it has been assigned to the 14th century. 
It has complex context and some marginalia.

Description 

The codex contains the text of the New Testament on 393 parchment leaves. It is written in one column per page, in 24 lines per page.

The order of books: Gospels, Acts, Catholic epistles, Pauline epistles, and Book of Revelation. The text of the Pericope Adulterae (John 7:53-8:11) is marked by an obelus.

Text 

The Greek text of the codex is a representative of the Byzantine text-type. Hermann von Soden classified it to the textual family Kr. Aland placed it in Category V.
According to the Claremont Profile Method it represents the textual family Kr in Luke 1 and Luke 20. It belongs to the textual cluster 167. In Luke 10 no profile was made.

History 

Formerly the manuscript, together with 388, 389, and 390 belonged to Giovanni Angelo Herzog von Altaemps († 1627).

The manuscript was added to the list of New Testament manuscripts by Scholz (1794-1852).
It was examined and described by Giuseppe Cozza-Luzi.
C. R. Gregory saw it in 1886.

It was examined by Ernesto Feron and Fabiano Battaglini (like minuscule 878 and 880).

The manuscript is currently housed at the Vatican Library (Ottob. gr. 66) in Rome.

See also 

 List of New Testament minuscules
 Biblical manuscript
 Textual criticism

References

Further reading 

 Ernesto Feron and Fabiano Battaglini, Codices manuscripti Graeci Ottoboniani bibliothecae Vaticanae, Rome 1893, p. 43.

External links 
 

Greek New Testament minuscules
14th-century biblical manuscripts
Manuscripts of the Vatican Library